Blood Promise may refer to:
Blood Promise (novel), a novel by Richelle Mead
Blood Promise (film), a film made in Hong Kong in 1975
A Blood Promise, a DVD/CD recorded by the band Her Name Is Calla